Shats may refer to:

Avner Shats, Israeli author
Mikhail Shats, Russian actor and activist
Shaul Shats, Israeli artist

See also
 Shat (disambiguation)
 Schatz